Canastota is a village located inside the Town of Lenox in Madison County, New York, United States. The population was 4,804 at the 2010 census.

The village of Canastota is in the southern part of the Town of Lenox. Canastota High School is located in the village.

History 

Kniste Stota was the historic name of the village, a term used by the local Oneida Nation of the Iroquois Confederacy, meaning "cluster of pines near still waters". The village recently celebrated the bicentennial of its settlement by European-Americans.

One early historic property is the Judge Nathan S. Roberts House, which dates to about 1820.

Canastota is well known as an onion-growing town, and that effort used to account for a large portion of the income in the village.

The village was incorporated in 1835, but was reorganized in 1870. Located along the banks of the Erie Canal, which was completed through the Mohawk River valley by 1825, Canastota was a vibrant trading and commercial town during the mid-nineteenth century for a wide agricultural area. When the canal was superseded by the construction of railroads, and later the New York Thruway, some canal towns were cut off from the main lines of commerce. During the 1850s, Charles Spencer became famous for constructing some of the best compound microscopes in the world, and Canastota became known as a "microscopic Mecca" despite its rural location. Robert Tolles, whose lenses later allowed observers to plumb the limits of light microscopy, studied with Spencer in Canastota and later partnered with him. 

Canastota is the namesake of Canistota, South Dakota.

Canastota has produced two world boxing champions, Carmen Basilio and Billy Backus, and is the home of the International Boxing Hall of Fame. The museum is located next to exit 34 of the New York State Thruway. Each second weekend in June, Canastota has hosted numerous past and current champions, including Muhammad Ali, George Foreman, Joe Frazier and Dickie DiVeronica.  A Sunday parade and an induction ceremony are held to honor past and current Hall of Fame inductees.

National Register of Historic Places

The following sites and historic districts are listed on the National Register of Historic Places.

|}

Geography
Canastota is located at  (43.080909, -75.753747).

Demographics

As of the census of 2000, there were 4,425 people, 1,872 households, and 1,173 families residing in the village. The population density was 1,332.3 people per square mile (514.6/km2). There were 1,994 housing units at an average density of 600.3 per square mile (231.9/km2). The racial makeup of the village was 97.31% White, 0.93% African American, 0.38% Native American, 0.29% Asian, 0.38% from other races, and 0.70% from two or more races. Hispanic or Latino of any race were 1.13% of the population.

There were 1,872 households, out of which 29.6% had children under the age of 18 living with them, 45.9% were married couples living together, 11.9% had a female householder with no husband present, and 37.3% were non-families. 32.2% of all households were made up of individuals, and 17.6% had someone living alone who was 65 years of age or older. The average household size was 2.36 and the average family size was 2.96.

In the village, the population was spread out, with 25.3% under the age of 18, 7.2% from 18 to 24, 28.7% from 25 to 44, 20.9% from 45 to 64, and 17.9% who were 65 years of age or older. The median age was 37 years. For every 100 females, there were 88.1 males. For every 100 females age 18 and over, there were 86.7 males.

The median income for a household in the village was $34,155, and the median income for a family was $43,049. Males had a median income of $31,296 versus $24,047 for females. The per capita income for the village was $16,324. About 10.0% of families and 14.8% of the population were below the poverty line, including 19.5% of those under age 18 and 19.8% of those age 65 or over.

Notable people
Billy Backus, former World Welterweight Champion
Carmen Basilio, former World Welterweight and Middleweight Champion
Milton De Lano, former US Congressman
Edmund Giambastiani, admiral of US Navy
Margaret Shulock, cartoonist

References

External links
 Village of Canastota, New York
 Canastota Public Library Digital Collection on New York Heritage

Villages in New York (state)
Syracuse metropolitan area
Populated places established in 1835
Villages in Madison County, New York
1835 establishments in New York (state)